The Journal of Neurology, Neurosurgery, and Psychiatry is a monthly peer-reviewed medical journal published by the BMJ Group. It covers research and reviews in the fields of neurology, neurosurgery, and psychiatry. Its Editor-in-Chief is Matthew Kiernan. (University of Sydney).

History
The journal was established in 1920 by Samuel Alexander Kinnier Wilson as the Journal of Neurology and Psychopathology. Wilson was the head of a nine-member editorial committee which, besides Wilson, consisted of Thomas Graham Brown, Carey Coombs, Henry Devine, Bernard Hart, Maurice Nicoll, Charles Stanford Read, Roy Mackenzie Stewart, and Charles Symonds. The journal was renamed Journal of Neurology and Psychiatry from 1938 to 1944, and then obtained its current title.

Abstracting and indexing 
The journal is abstracted and indexed in Web of Science Core Collection: Science Citation Index, Science Citation Index Extended, BIOSIS Previews, Index Medicus/MEDLINE, Current Contents, Scopus, Excerpta Medica/EMBASE, Life Sciences, PubMed Central (BMJ Open Access Special Collection), CINAHL and Google Scholar. According to the Journal Citation Reports, the journal has a 2019 impact factor of 8.234 and is ranked 3/210 in the category "Surgery", 8/155 in "Psychiatry" and 12/204 in "Clinical Neurology".

References

External links

Neurology journals
Publications established in 1920
BMJ Group academic journals
Monthly journals
Psychiatry journals
English-language journals
Neurosurgery journals